Lythrum flagellare, also known as Florida loosestrife and lowland loosestrife, is a species of plant belonging to the family Lythraceae. It is endemic to U.S. state of Florida. The flower is known for it is sprawling habit, hence the species epithet flagellare.

References

Endemic flora of Florida
flagellare
Flora without expected TNC conservation status
Taxa named by Alvan Wentworth Chapman